MJ & Friends were two stadium concerts held by American singer/songwriter Michael Jackson in 1999, with numerous other performers as well, including Slash of Guns N' Roses. The purpose of the tour was to raise funds for children in Kosovo, Africa and elsewhere. Jackson gave two concerts during the tour. The first one took place in Seoul, South Korea on June 25 (exactly ten years before his death) and the second one was in Munich, Germany.

Munich bridge accident
At the Munich concert, while performing "Earth Song", the middle section of the bridge collapsed after ascending into the air. Jackson climbed out of the pit that the mechanism landed in, and continued the song without missing a beat. The guitarist Slash was front and center on the main stage at the time: he also continued his performance without missing a beat, while dashing upstage to safety. Jackson finished the concert, but was taken to the Rechts der Isar Hospital afterwards. He suffered a sprained ankle, shock nerves and slight burns on his arms. None of the fans, crew or backup performers were injured. The crash was confirmed to be a mechanical failure from the crane, as of Kenny Ortega, director of the shows.

The same stunt had been performed without the incident at the first concert in Seoul.

Millennium Concert
On December 31, 1999 and January 1, 2000, Michael Jackson was scheduled to perform at Aloha Stadium in Hawaii, USA and at Stadium Australia, Sydney, Australia and Buenos Aires, Argentina. These plans were later cancelled and removed from the MJ and Friends Tour.

Michael Jackson's set list 
"Medley: Don't Stop 'Til You Get Enough/The Way You Make Me Feel/Scream/Beat It/Black Or White/Billie Jean" 
"Dangerous" (contains excerpts of "Smooth Criminal")
"Earth Song"
"You Are Not Alone"
"Heal The World"

Notes 
 Jackson was joined by long-time collaborator Slash during the two concerts.
 "She's Out of My Life" was reportedly planned and rehearsed for the Seoul concert as a duet with Mariah Carey, but was canceled for unknown reasons.

Tour dates

Cancelled Shows

Known preparation dates

References

See also
Philanthropy of Michael Jackson

1999 concert tours
1999 in German music
1999 in South Korean music
1990s in Munich
1990s in Seoul
Benefit concerts
June 1999 events in Asia
Michael Jackson concerts
Music in Munich
Music in Seoul
June 1999 events in Europe